At least three ships of the French Navy have been named Ajax

 , a 64-gun ship of the line acquired in 1779
 , a 74-gun ship of the line launched in 1806
 , a submarine launched in 1930 and scuttled in 1940

See also
 

French Navy ship names